Marion Sylvester "Bud" Zipfel (born November 18, 1938) is a retired American professional baseball player who appeared in 118 games over two seasons in Major League Baseball for the 1961–1962 Washington Senators.

Baseball career
After graduating from Belleville High School in 1956, Zipfel signed with the New York Yankees. He steadily progressed through the Yankees' minor league system over the next five years, showing some potential as a powerful, left-handed-hitting first baseman. He exceeded the 20-homer mark twice, in the Class D New York–Penn League (21 in 1958) and the Class A Eastern League (28 in 1960).

On December 14, 1960, Zipfel was chosen by the Los Angeles Angels in the 29th round of the 1960 Major League Baseball expansion draft and was then immediately traded to the expansion edition of the Senators for infielder Ken Hamlin. Zipfel had an "impressive" spring training with the Senators in 1961 and, after continuing his powerful hitting in the minor leagues - he had his best statistical season in 1961 playing for the Syracuse Chiefs, batting .312 with 18 home runs over 101 games - Zipfel made his major league debut with Washington on July 26, 1961. He remained on the big league squad for the rest of the season as a backup first baseman, but was less impressive, and hit .200 with only four home runs over 50 games.

Zipfel was drafted into the United States Marine Corps soon after the 1961 baseball season but completed his service in time to rejoin the Senators at the end of spring training in 1962. He began the season in the minor leagues and was recalled to the major league squad on June 26, 1962. Zipfel remained with the Senators for the rest of the season, splitting time between first base and left field. He again struggled to hit major league pitching, batting .239 with six home runs over 68 games. The highlight of his season was a 16th inning home run (the last of his major league career) that provided the winning margin in a game in which teammate Tom Cheney struck out a record 21 batters in a 228 pitch complete game on September 12.

The Senators sold Zipfel's contract to the Cincinnati Reds at the end of the 1962 season. For the next four years, he played for minor league affiliates of the Reds, Detroit Tigers, Philadelphia Phillies and St. Louis Cardinals. He was not recalled to the major leagues and he retired from baseball after the 1966 season.

Bud Zipfel is best remembered for hitting the game-winning home run on September 12, 1962, where Tom Cheney set the Major League Baseball record for strikeouts in a regular-season game. Cheney pitched brilliantly in 16 innings of work, giving up only one run while striking out a record 21 Baltimore Orioles. Cheney had 13 strikeouts through nine innings.

It was not until the bottom of the 16th inning that teammate Bud Zipfel hit the game-winning home run off Orioles pitcher Dick Hall giving the Senators a hard-fought 2–1 victory and Cheney a win and a major league record that still stands today. To this day, Roger Clemens, Kerry Wood, and Max Scherzer have come threateningly close to Cheney's record, but all four have failed, each striking out 20 men in their respective 9-inning regulation games.

After baseball
After returning to Bellevelle, Zipfel became a successful real estate agent and developer.

References

External links

1938 births
Living people
Arkansas Travelers players
Auburn Yankees players
Baseball players from Illinois
Belleville High School-West alumni
Binghamton Triplets players
Businesspeople from Illinois
Fargo-Moorhead Twins players
Greenville Majors players
Houston Buffs players
Jacksonville Suns players
Knoxville Smokies players
Macon Peaches players
Major League Baseball first basemen
Military personnel from Illinois
Quincy Gems players
San Diego Padres (minor league) players
Sportspeople from Belleville, Illinois
Syracuse Chiefs players
Tidewater Tides players
Washington Senators (1961–1971) players